Thryptomene micrantha, commonly known as ribbed thryptomene, is a species of flowering plant in the family Myrtaceae and is endemic to south-eastern Australia. It is a spreading to erect shrub with egg-shaped leaves, the narrower end towards the base, and white flowers with five petals and five stamens.

Description
Flowering mainly occurs from August to October.

Taxonomy and naming
Thryptomene micrantha was first formally described  in 1853 by English botanist Joseph Dalton Hooker in Hooker's Journal of Botany and Kew Garden Miscellany. His description was based on a collection made by Ronald Campbell Gunn from plants growing on "banks of sand and oyster-shells" on Schouten Island off Tasmania's east coast. The specific epithet (micrantha) means "small-flowered".

Distribution and habitat
Ribbed thryptomene occurs in scattered populations in South Australia, Victoria and Tasmania, growing in heath or woodland, sometimes in shrubland on rocky slopes. In Victoria it occurs in the region of the Gippsland Lakes, while in Tasmania populations are mostly confined to the Freycinet National Park. In South Australia it is found mainly on the Eyre and Yorke peninsulas.

Conservation status
In Tasmania this species is listed as "vulnerable" under the Threatened Species Protection Act 1995, and in Victoria as "rare" on the Department of Sustainability and Environment's Advisory List of Rare Or Threatened Plants In Victoria.

References

micrantha
Flora of South Australia
Flora of Tasmania
Flora of Victoria (Australia)
Plants described in 1853
Taxa named by Joseph Dalton Hooker